In Favor of the Sensitive Man: And Other Essays is a collection of essays published by Anaïs Nin in 1976.

Content
Women and men
 Eroticism in Women
 The New Women
 Anais Nin Talks About Being a Woman:
(i) An Interview
(ii) Notes on Feminism
(iii) My Sister, My Spouse
(iv) Between Me And Life
(v) Women and Children in Japan
(vi) In Favor of the Sensitive Man

Writing, Music and Films
 On Truth and Reality
 The Story of my Printing Press
 Novelist on Stage
 Out of the Labyrinth: An Interview
 The Suicide Academy
 Miss Macintosh, My Darling
 Angel in the Forest
 Edgar Varése
 At a Journal Workshop
 Henry Jaglom: Magician of the Film
 Un Chant de' Armour
 Ingmar Bergman
Enchanted Places
 The Labyrinthine City of Fez
 Morocco
 The Spirit of Bali
 Port Vila, New Hebrides
 The Swallow Never Leave Noumea
 My Turkish Grandmother

References

1976 non-fiction books
Essays by Anaïs Nin
American essay collections